The 5th Rand Grand Prix was a motor race, run to Formula One rules, held on 15 December 1962 at Kyalami, South Africa. The race was run over 50 laps of the circuit, and was won by British driver Jim Clark, who led from start to finish in his Lotus 25.

There were a very large number of entries for this race, and many of the local drivers did not qualify. Among the more unusual entries was the Lotus 7 of Brausch Niemann, and the non-qualifying Cooper of Dave Riley, which was fitted with a BMC engine.

Results

Gary Hocking was also entered in his own Lotus-Climax, but raced the one entered by the Rob Walker Racing Team.
Scuderia Lupini entered a Cooper-Maserati but withdrew it without designating a driver.

References
 "The Grand Prix Who's Who", Steve Small, 1995.
 "The Formula One Record Book", John Thompson, 1974.
 Race results at www.silhouet.com 

Rand Grand Prix
Rand Grand Prix
Rand Grand Prix
Rand Grand Prix